The 2021 CONCACAF League Final was the final round of the 2021 CONCACAF League, the fifth edition of the CONCACAF League, the secondary club football tournament organised by CONCACAF, the regional governing body of North America, Central America, and the Caribbean.

The final was contested in two-legged home-and-away format between Motagua from Honduras and Comunicaciones from Guatemala. 

The first leg was hosted by Motagua at the Estadio Tiburcio Carías Andino in Tegucigalpa on 8 December 2021, and the second leg was hosted by Comunicaciones at the Estadio Doroteo Guamuch Flores in Guatemala City on 14 December 2021.

Teams

Venues

Road to the final

Note: In all results below, the score of the finalist is given first (H: home; A: away).

Format
The final was played on a home-and-away two-legged basis, with the team with the better performance in previous rounds (excluding preliminary round) hosting the second leg.

The away goals rule will not be applied, and extra time would be played if the aggregate score was tied after the second leg. If the aggregate score was still tied after extra time, the penalty shoot-out would be used to determine the winner (Regulations II, Article G).

Performance ranking

Matches

First leg
</onlyinclude>

Second leg
</onlyinclude>

References

External links

 
CONCACAF League Finals
2021–22 in Honduran football
International association football competitions hosted by Honduras
International association football competitions hosted by Guatemala
CONCACAF League Final
F.C. Motagua matches
Comunicaciones F.C. matches